Osmia integra is a species of bee in the family Megachilidae. It is found in North America.

Subspecies
These two subspecies belong to the species Osmia integra:
 Osmia integra integra
 Osmia integra nigrigena

References

Further reading

External links

 

integra
Articles created by Qbugbot
Insects described in 1878